Dr. Feelgood (stylized as ) is the fifth studio album by American heavy metal band Mötley Crüe, released on August 28, 1989. Dr. Feelgood topped the Billboard 200 chart, making it the band's only album to claim this position. It was the first album Mötley Crüe recorded after their quest for sobriety and rehabilitation in 1989. In addition to being Mötley Crüe's best selling album, it is highly regarded by music critics and fans as the band's best studio album. This was also the band's last album to be recorded with lead singer Vince Neil until the 1997 album Generation Swine.

Recording
Producer Bob Rock found working with the Crüe difficult, describing them as "four L.A. bad asses who used to drink a bottle of wine and want to kill each other." To minimize conflict and allow production to proceed smoothly, Rock had each member record their parts separately.

The lyrics of "Don't Go Away Mad (Just Go Away)" feature a reference to "Too Young to Fall in Love" from the band's 1983 album Shout at the Devil.

The intro track "T.n.T. (Terror 'n Tinseltown)" features a sample of a woman saying "Dr Davis, telephone please". This was the same sample used by the band Queensrÿche for their song "Eyes of a Stranger" which was off of their album Operation: Mindcrime released one year prior to Dr. Feelgood.

The end of "Slice of Your Pie" is based on "She's So Heavy", from the Beatles' Abbey Road album.

Steven Tyler of Aerosmith sings backing vocals on "Sticky Sweet". "Nikki and Tommy and I hung out a lot," said Tyler, who was in Vancouver around the same time, recording Pump. "Of course, we're all akin by our old drinking and drugging days."

Release
Dr. Feelgood has sold more than 6 million copies in the U.S., and went Gold in the U.K. In various interviews, members of Mötley Crüe stated that it was their most solid album from a musical standpoint, due in no small part to their collective push for sobriety.

Critical reception

Reviews for Dr. Feelgood have been highly positive. Critics remarked the renewed energy and entertaining values that permeate the album, bringing the listeners "in a world of everlasting party",  where they "savored the joys of trashy, unapologetically decadent fun". Bob Rock's meticulous production was universally praised, in particular for affording "the band the ability to write stronger melodic hooks without losing the hard rock sound they so coveted" and for the power of the guitar riffs.

Canadian journalist Martin Popoff wrote that Dr. Feelgood is an album "made by a dumb band trying really hard" while a BBC Music reviewer declared it "a glitzy flashy experience... ultimately shallow and narcissistic". Other critics stated that Mötley Crüe are not "out to win humanitarian awards or impress us with lyrical muscle", but to rock "...hard"! Dr. Feelgood, wrote Mick Wall in a review of 2009's reissue, "was the first time Mötley Crüe actually became well-known for music. Until then, their unthinking mash-up of glam and metal had made them a hoot onstage but a disappointment on record... Though pushed close by last year's shock return with the weighty Saints of Los Angeles, [the album is] the best Mötley Crüe have ever released."

"Dr. Feelgood" and "Kickstart My Heart" were nominated for Grammy awards for Best Hard Rock Performance in 1990 and 1991, but lost both years to Living Colour. Mötley Crüe won the best Hard rock/Heavy metal album of the year at the American Music Awards in January 1991 for Dr. Feelgood.

Legacy
Metallica drummer Lars Ulrich recruited Bob Rock to produce their self-titled 1991 album after being impressed with Rock's production work on Dr. Feelgood. Rock would later produce Metallica's subsequent albums, until St. Anger, where he also played that album's bass parts.

Nike SB created a shoe based on the album cover.

As of October 14, 2008, the album, minus the opening track "T.N.T. (Terror 'N Tinseltown)" because of length and playability, has become downloadable content for the Rock Band video game series. The tracks "Dr. Feelgood" and "Kickstart My Heart" were also released as downloadable content for the video game Rocksmith 2014 in 2015.
 
"Dr. Feelgood" and "Kickstart My Heart" are available in the soundtrack of 2009 video game, Brütal Legend

To mark the twentieth anniversary of the album, Mötley Crüe performed the album in its entirety at Crüe Fest 2.

Track listing

Note
The original Korean LP edition does not contain the first two tracks, "T.n.T. (Terror 'n Tinseltown)" and "Dr. Feelgood".

Dr. Feelgood: The Videos
Dr. Feelgood: The Videos is a video album released in 1990 and features all the music videos from the album, concert footage, interviews and recording session footage.
 
Videos include
 "Dr. Feelgood"
 "Kickstart My Heart"
 "Without You"
 "Don't Go Away Mad (Just Go Away)"
 "Same Ol' Situation (S.O.S.)"

Personnel

Mötley Crüe
Vince Neil – lead and backing vocals, rhythm guitar, harmonica, shakers
Mick Mars – lead guitar, backing vocals
Nikki Sixx – bass, (all but Time for Change), backing vocals, organ and piano (Time for Change)
Tommy Lee – drums, backing vocals

Additional musicians
Bob Rock – bass (Time for Change), background vocals (Dr. Feelgood, Rattlesnake Shake, Sticky Sweet, She Goes Down)
John Webster – honky tonk piano (Rattlesnake Shake), keyboards & programming
Tom Keenlyside, Ian Putz, Ross Gregory, Henry Christian – Marguerita Horns (Rattlesnake Shake)
Donna McDaniel, Emi Canyn, Marc LaFrance, David Steele – background vocals
Steven Tyler – background vocals (Sticky Sweet), intro (Slice of Your Pie)
Bryan Adams – background vocals (Sticky Sweet)
Jack Blades – background vocals (Same Ol' Situation, Sticky Sweet)
Robin Zander, Rick Nielsen – background vocals (She Goes Down)
Skid Row, Bob Dowd, Mike Amato, Toby Francis – background vocals (Time for Change)

Production
Bob Rock - producer, engineer, mixing
Randy Staub - engineer, mixing
Chris Taylor - assistant engineer
George Marino - mastering at Sterling Sound, New York
Bob Defrin  –  art direction
Don Brautigam  –  cover art illustration
William Hames  –  photography
Kevin Brady  –  artwork, design
Mike Amato - project coordinator

Charts

Certifications

Album

Video

References

1989 albums
1990 video albums
Mötley Crüe albums
Elektra Records albums
Elektra Records video albums
Albums produced by Bob Rock
Albums recorded at Little Mountain Sound Studios